The 1984 Ohio Bobcats football team was an American football team that represented Ohio University in the Mid-American Conference (MAC) during the 1984 NCAA Division I-A football season. In their sixth and final season under head coach Brian Burke, the Bobcats compiled a 4–6–1 record (4–4–1 against MAC opponents), finished in fourth place in the MAC, and were outscored by all opponents by a combined total of 262 to 134.  They played their home games in Peden Stadium in Athens, Ohio.

Schedule

References

Ohio
Ohio Bobcats football seasons
Ohio Bobcats football